Salem Mouled Al-Ahmadi (born 12 September 1969) is a Saudi Arabian triple jumper. His personal best jump is 17.07 metres, achieved in May 1997 in Riyadh.

He won the bronze medal at the 2000 Asian Championships, the gold medals at the 2002 Asian Games and the 2002 Asian Championships and finished fifth at the 2005 Asian Championships. He also competed at the 1997 World Indoor Championships, the 1999 World Championships, the 2000 Olympic Games, the 2003 World Championships and the 2004 Olympic Games without reaching the final.

Competition record

References 

1969 births
Living people
Saudi Arabian male triple jumpers
Athletes (track and field) at the 1996 Summer Olympics
Athletes (track and field) at the 2000 Summer Olympics
Athletes (track and field) at the 2004 Summer Olympics
Olympic athletes of Saudi Arabia
Asian Games medalists in athletics (track and field)
Athletes (track and field) at the 1994 Asian Games
Athletes (track and field) at the 2002 Asian Games
Asian Games gold medalists for Saudi Arabia
Medalists at the 2002 Asian Games